is a Japanese singer, rapper, actor, and television host. He is a former member of V6, a dance-vocal group formed in 1995 by Johnny & Associates, and its subunit 20th Century. He is best-known for his role in the popular tokusatsu series Ultraman Tiga, as the lead character, Daigo Madoka/Ultraman Tiga.

Career
In 1986, at age 14, Nagano joined Johnny & Associates as a Johnny's Jr. He quit Johnny's Jr. in 1990 to continue his studies but rejoined in mid-1992. V6 was formed on 4 September 1995. They made their CD debut on 1 November 1995.

In 1988, Nagano made his acting debut in the television series, Kinpachi-sensei. He landed his first lead role in 1996 as Daigo Madoka in the tokusatsu television drama Ultraman Tiga. In addition to starring in the Ultraman Tiga television series, he has also appeared in several of its spin-offs and feature films.

Personal life
Nagano was born on 9 October 1972 in Yamato, Kanagawa. His parents run a bicycle shop. Nagano is a qualified chef and vegetable sommelier. He married actress Miho Shiraishi on 29 November 2016. They have two children.

Filmography

Film

Television (as an actor)

Television (as a personality)

References

Living people
1972 births
Johnny & Associates
Japanese male pop singers
People from Yamato, Kanagawa
Male actors from Kanagawa Prefecture
21st-century Japanese singers
21st-century Japanese male singers